Eye color 1 (green/blue) or EYCL1 is a gene or a set of genes in humans located on chromosome 19. Its previous gene name was GEY. It is phenotype only.

References 

Genes on human chromosome 19